Linzhiite is an iron silicide mineral with the formula FeSi2. It was discovered in the 1960s in Donetsk Oblast in Soviet Union, and named ferdisilicite, but was not approved by the International Mineralogical Association. It was later rediscovered near Linzhi in Tibet. Linzhiite occurs together with other rare iron silicide minerals, xifengite (Fe5Si3) and naquite (FeSi).

References

Iron minerals
Minerals described in 2012